Pratap Gowda Patil is an Indian politician. He was elected 3 times (hat trick) to the Karnataka Legislative Assembly from Maski in the 2018 Karnataka Legislative Assembly election as a member of the Indian National Congress.

References

1955 births
Living people
Bharatiya Janata Party politicians from Karnataka
Indian National Congress politicians from Karnataka
People from Raichur district
Karnataka MLAs 2018–2023